Jirjis al-Makīn (1205–1273), known by his nisba Ibn al-ʿAmīd, was a Coptic Christian historian who wrote in Arabic. His name is sometimes anglicised as George Elmacin.

Life
The details of his life come from passages at the end of his own history. He was born in Cairo in Ayyubid Egypt in 1205. His full name in Arabic was Ğirğis (George) ibn Abī ūl-Yāsir ibn Abī ūl-Mukārīm ibn Abī ūṭ-Ṭayyib al-ʿAmīd al-Makīn ("the Powerful One"). His great grandfather was a merchant from Tikrit in Iraq who settled in Egypt.

He was a Coptic Christian, and held high office in the military (dīwān al-ğayš) in Cairo.

Such a position carried risks.  He was twice imprisoned, possibly because of links to the contemporary unrest in Syria at the time of the Mongol invasion; in one case for over a decade.

After his release, he wrote his chronicle in the years 1262-8, after his career (and his time in prison) was over.

Later he moved to Damascus, where he died in 1273.

Works

His sole surviving work is a world chronicle in two parts, entitled al-Majmu` al-Mubarak (The blessed collection).  The first portion runs from Adam down to the 11th year of Heraclius. The second half is a history of the Saracens, which extends from the time of Mohammed to the accession of the Mameluke Sultan Baybars in 1260. The second half is mainly derived from the Persian writer Al-Tabari, as the author tells us, and was used by later Moslem and Christian writers.

In the first half, the work is structured as a series of numbered biographies of the most important men of the time, with Adam as the first.  Down to 586 BC, the history is based on the bible.  Later data is based on various sources, some otherwise unknown to us.  The first half ends with a list of Patriarchs of the church of Alexandria.

The work was not hugely original.  He drew on earlier sources, including the world history of ibn al-Rahib.  But it was very influential in both East and West.  It was used by the 14-15th century Moslem historians Ibn Khaldun, al-Qalqashandi, and al-Maqrizi.

The second half was published in Arabic and Latin at Leiden in 1625. The Latin version is a translation by Thomas Erpenius (van Erpen), under the title, Historia saracenica, while a French translation was made by Pierre Vattier as L'Histoire mahometane (Paris, 1657).  An abbreviated English translation was also made from the Latin by Purchas.  The translation by Erpenius was one of the first ever made of an Arabic text in modern times, and suffers accordingly from the lack of Lexica and difficulties with the language.

No edition of the whole work exists; no critical edition of any part of it, or any translation into any modern language of any but trivial portions.  This lack is a considerable problem for philology, and renders the text effectively inaccessible to scholarship.  Manuscripts of the complete text exist, as well as manuscripts of each half individually.  The British Library has the oldest complete manuscript, BL. Or. 7564, from 1280 A.D. The Bodleian Library in Oxford has a manuscript which includes an unpublished Latin translation of the end of the first half and all of the second.

An Ethiopic translation of the whole work also exists, again unpublished, which follows the Arabic closely.  It was made in the reign of Lebna Dengal (1508–40).  A copy exists in the British Library, shelfmark "Ms. Oriental 814", comprising 119 folios of the 175 folio book.  From this E.Wallis Budge translated the chapter on Alexander the Great, which contains verbatim extracts from the old Arabic Hermetic work al-Istamakhis.

A continuation of the Chronicle also exists, written by Al-Muffadal ibn abi Al-Fada`il, who was also a Copt and may have been the author's great-nephew.  It continues the text to the death of al-Malik al-Nasir in 1341.  This contains only limited references to events in the Coptic community, and is mainly a secular history concerned with Moslem affairs.  The continuation survives in only a single manuscript, and was apparently written for personal use.

References

Citations

Bibliography
 Georg Graf, Geschichte der christlichen arabischen Literatur, volume 2.  Lists manuscripts of the work.
 M. Th. Houtsma, E. van Donzel, E. J. Brill's First Encyclopaedia of Islam, 1913-1936, p. 173f.  At Google books
 The Saracentical historie ... Written in Arabike by George Elmacin ... And translated into Latine by Thomas Erpenius ... Englished, abridged, and continued to the end of the Chalifa's, by Samuel Purchas ...: p. [1009]-1047, incl. special t.p.  -- the 4th part of Pvrchas his Pilgrimage..., 4th ed (?) London (1626).
Cahen, Claude. "la « Chronique Des Ayyoubides » D’al-makīn B. Al-’amīd." Bulletin D’études Orientales, Vol. 15, Institut Francais Du Proche-orient, 1955, Pp. 109–84, .
 Al-Makin Ibn Al-Amid, Chronique des Ayyoubides (602-658 / 1205/6-1259/60), Tr. Françoise Micheau, Anne-Marie Eddé Broché, (1994), . 148pp. -- French translation of the portion from 1205-1259.
 Witold Witakowski, Ethiopic Universal Chronography in Martin Wallraff, Julius Africanus und die christliche Weltchronistik, deGruyter (2006) p. 285-301.
 Gawdat Gabra, Historical Dictionary of the Coptic Church, Scarecrow Press (2008), . pp. 22–23.

External links
 Manuscripts of the history of al-Makin.

Patristic scholars
Coptic Christians from Egypt
1223 births
1274 deaths
Historians from the Ayyubid Sultanate
13th-century Egyptian historians